A royal wedding is a marriage ceremony involving members of a royal family. Weddings involving senior members of the royal family are often seen as important occasions of state and attract significant national and international attention. The following is a list of notable royal weddings:

16th century

England and Spain
 25 July 1554: Mary I of England, elder daughter of King Henry VIII and successor of King Edward VI, was married to Philip, Prince of Asturias, eldest son and successor of King Charles I of Spain, at Winchester Cathedral.

17th century

Great Britain and the Electoral Palatinate
 14 February 1613: Princess Elizabeth, eldest daughter of King James VI and I, was married to Frederick V of the Palatinate at Whitehall Palace.

Sweden 
 25 November 1620: King Gustaf II Adolf, eldest surviving son and successor of King Charles IX, was married to Maria Eleonora of Brandenburg, second daughter of John Sigismund, Elector of Brandenburg, at the Royal Castle.

18th century

Portugal and Spain 
 19 January 1729: In two simultaneous ceremonies, Joseph, Prince of Brazil, eldest son and successor of King John V of Portugal, was married to Infanta Mariana Victoria of Spain, while Mariana's half-brother Ferdinand, Prince of Asturias, second son and successor of King Philip V of Spain, was married to Joseph's sister Infanta Barbara of Portugal.

Sweden 
 4 November 1766: Crown Prince Gustav, eldest son and successor of King Adolf Frederick, was married to Princess Sophia Magdalena of Denmark, daughter of King Frederick V of Denmark, at Stockholm Palace.

19th century

Russian Empire
 26 November 1895: Nicholas II, the last Emperor of Russia, eldest son and successor of Emperor Alexander III, was married to Princess Alix of Hesse and by Rhine, fourth daughter of Louis IV, Grand Duke of Hesse, at the Grand Church of the Winter Palace.

United Kingdom
 10 February 1840: Queen Victoria, only daughter of Prince Edward, Duke of Kent and Strathearn, granddaughter of King George III, and successor of King William IV, was married to Prince Albert of Saxe-Coburg and Gotha, Duke of Saxony, younger son of Ernest I, Duke of Saxe-Coburg and Gotha, at the Chapel Royal, St James's Palace.
 10 March 1863: Albert Edward, Prince of Wales, eldest son and successor of Queen Victoria, was married to Princess Alexandra of Denmark, eldest daughter of the future King Christian IX of Denmark, at St George’s Chapel, Windsor Castle.
 6 July 1893: Prince George, Duke of York, grandson of Queen Victoria and second son and successor of the future King Edward VII, was married to Princess Victoria Mary of Teck at the Chapel Royal, St James's Palace.

20th century

Belgium
 15 December 1960: King Baudouin, elder son and successor of King Leopold III, was married to Doña Fabiola de Mora y Aragón at the Cathedral of St. Michael and St. Gudula.
 4 December 1999: Prince Philippe, Duke of Brabant, eldest child and successor of King Albert II, was married to Mathilde d'Udekem d'Acoz at the Cathedral of St. Michael and St. Gudula.

Greece
 14 May 1962: Princess Sophia, eldest child of King Paul, was married to Juan Carlos, Prince of Spain, the future King of Spain, at the Cathedral Basilica of St. Dionysius the Areopagite.
 18 September 1964: King Constantine II, only son and successor of King Paul, was married to Princess Anne-Marie of Denmark, youngest daughter of King Frederick IX of Denmark, at the Metropolitan Cathedral of Athens.
 1 July 1995: Pavlos, former Crown Prince of Greece, eldest son and second child of former King Constantine II, was married to Marie-Chantal Miller at St Sophia's Cathedral, London.

Monaco
 19 April 1956: Prince Rainier III, only grandson and successor of Prince Louis II, was married to Grace Kelly at the Cathedral of Our Lady Immaculate.

Nepal
 27 February 1970: Crown Prince Birendra of Nepal, eldest son and successor of King Mahendra, was married to Aishwarya Rajya Lakshmi Devi Rana.

The Netherlands
 10 March 1966: Princess Beatrix of the Netherlands, eldest child and successor of Queen Juliana, was married to Klaus von Amsberg at Prinsenhof.

Sweden
 19 June 1976: King Carl XVI Gustaf, grandson and successor of King Gustaf VI Adolf, was married to Silvia Sommerlath at Storkyrkan.

United Kingdom
 26 April 1923: Prince Albert, Duke of York, second son of King George V and successor of the future King Edward VIII, was married to Lady Elizabeth Bowes-Lyon at Westminster Abbey.
 29 November 1934: Prince George, Duke of Kent, fourth son of King George V, was married to Princess Marina of Greece and Denmark, granddaughter of King George I of Greece, at Westminster Abbey.
 6 November 1935: Prince Henry, Duke of Gloucester, third son of King George V, was married to Lady Alice Montagu Douglas Scott at the private chapel at Buckingham Palace.
 20 November 1947: Princess Elizabeth, elder daughter and successor of King George VI, was married to Lieutenant Philip Mountbatten at Westminster Abbey.
 6 May 1960: Princess Margaret, younger daughter of King George VI, was married to Antony Armstrong-Jones at Westminster Abbey.
 8 June 1961: Prince Edward, Duke of Kent, third grandson of King George V and elder son and successor of Prince George, Duke of Kent, was married to  Katharine Worsley at York Minster.
 24 April 1963: Princess Alexandra of Kent, third granddaughter of King George V and only daughter of Prince George, Duke of Kent, was married to The Hon. Angus Ogilvy at Westminster Abbey.
 14 November 1973: Princess Anne, only daughter of Queen Elizabeth II, was married to Captain Mark Phillips at Westminster Abbey.
 29 July 1981: Charles, Prince of Wales, eldest son of and successor of Queen Elizabeth II, was married to Lady Diana Spencer at St Paul's Cathedral.
 23 July 1986: Prince Andrew, Duke of York, second son of Queen Elizabeth II, was married to Sarah Ferguson at Westminster Abbey.
 19 June 1999: Prince Edward, Earl of Wessex, youngest son of Queen Elizabeth II, was married to Sophie Rhys-Jones at St George's Chapel, Windsor Castle.

21st century

Bhutan
 13 October 2011: Jigme Khesar Namgyel Wangchuck, King of Bhutan, eldest son and successor of King Jigme Singye Wangchuck, was married to Jetsun Pema at the Punakha Dzong in Punakha, Bhutan.

Denmark
 14 May 2004: Crown Prince Frederik of Denmark, elder son of Queen Margrethe II of Denmark and heir apparent, was married to Mary Elizabeth Donaldson at the Church of Our Lady, Copenhagen.

Luxembourg
 20 October 2012: Hereditary Grand Duke Guillaume, eldest child of Henri, Grand Duke of Luxembourg and heir apparent, was married to Countess Stephanie de Lannoy at the Notre-Dame Cathedral, Luxembourg.

Monaco
 1 July 2011: Albert II, Sovereign Prince of Monaco, only son and successor of Prince Rainier III, was married to Charlene Lynette Wittstock at the Prince's Palace of Monaco.

The Netherlands
 2 February 2002: Willem-Alexander, Prince of Orange, eldest son and successor of Queen Beatrix of the Netherlands, was married to Máxima Zorreguieta Cerruti at Nieuwe Kerk, Amsterdam.

Norway
 25 August 2001: Crown Prince Haakon of Norway, only son of King Harald V of Norway and heir apparent, was married to Mette-Marit Tjessem Høiby at the Oslo Cathedral.

Spain
 22 May 2004: Infante Felipe, Prince of Asturias, only son and successor of King Juan Carlos I of Spain, was married to Letizia Ortiz at the Almudena Cathedral at Royal Palace of Madrid, Madrid.

Sweden
 19 June 2010: Crown Princess Victoria of Sweden, eldest child and heir apparent of King Carl XVI Gustaf, was married to Daniel Westling at the Stockholm Cathedral.
 8 June 2013: Princess Madeleine, Duchess of Hälsingland and Gästrikland, youngest child of King Carl XVI Gustaf, was married to Christopher O'Neill at the Stockholm Palace Church.
 13 June 2015: Prince Carl Philip, Duke of Värmland, only son of King Carl XVI Gustaf, was married to Sofia Hellqvist at the Stockholm Palace Church.

Tonga
 12 July 2012: Crown Prince Tupoutoʻa ʻUlukalala, elder son of King Tupou VI and heir apparent, was married to Sinaitakala Fakafanua at the Centennial Church in Nukuʻalofa, Tonga.

United Kingdom
 9 April 2005: Charles, Prince of Wales, eldest son and successor of Queen Elizabeth II, was married to Camilla Parker Bowles at Windsor Guildhall.
 29 April 2011: Prince William, Duke of Cambridge, second grandson of Queen Elizabeth II, elder son of Charles, Prince of Wales, later Charles III and Lady Diana Spencer, was married to Catherine Middleton at Westminster Abbey.
 19 May 2018: Prince Harry, Duke of Sussex, third grandson of Queen Elizabeth II, younger son of Charles, Prince of Wales, later Charles III and Lady Diana Spencer, was married to Meghan Markle at St George's Chapel, Windsor Castle.
 12 October 2018: Princess Eugenie of York, third granddaughter of Queen Elizabeth II, younger daughter of Prince Andrew, Duke of York and Sarah Ferguson, was married to Jack Brooksbank at St George's Chapel, Windsor Castle.
 17 July 2020: Princess Beatrice of York, second granddaughter of Queen Elizabeth II, elder daughter of Prince Andrew, Duke of York and Sarah Ferguson, was married to Edoardo Mapelli Mozzi at the Royal Chapel of All Saints at Royal Lodge, Windsor.

References

External links
The Royal Weddings Collection - Archived newsreels of British Royal Weddings
Royal wedding footage

Royal weddings
Weddings